North East Bedfordshire is a constituency represented in the House of Commons of the Parliament of the United Kingdom since 2019 by Richard Fuller, of the Conservative Party.

Constituency profile 
This is a mainly rural, professional area, with medium level incomes, low unemployment and a low proportion of social housing. The East Coast Main Line runs through the east part of the seat, with several stations connecting to Central London.

Boundaries and boundary changes

1997–2010: The District of Mid Bedfordshire wards of Arlesey, Biggleswade Ivel, Biggleswade Stratton, Blunham, Langford, Northill, Old Warden and Southill, Potton, Sandy All Saints, Sandy St Swithun's, Stotfold, and Wensley; and the Borough of Bedford wards of Bromham, Carlton, Clapham, Eastcotts, Felmersham, Great Barford, Harrold, Oakley, Renhold, Riseley, Roxton, and Sharnbrook.

New County Constituency comprises primarily the eastern half of Mid Bedfordshire, including Biggleswade and Sandy. It also includes rural areas previously in the abolished County Constituency of North Bedfordshire.

2010–present: The District of Mid Bedfordshire wards of Arlesey, Biggleswade Holme, Biggleswade Ivel, Biggleswade Stratton, Langford and Henlow Village, Northill and Blunham, Potton and Wensley, Sandy Ivel, Sandy Pinnacle, and Stotfold; and the Borough of Bedford wards of Bromham, Carlton, Clapham, Eastcotts, Great Barford, Harrold, Oakley, Riseley, Roxton, and Sharnbrook.

Marginal loss to Mid Bedfordshire due to revision of local authority wards.

Members of Parliament

Elections

Elections in the 2010s

Elections in the 2000s

Elections in the 1990s

See also
List of parliamentary constituencies in Bedfordshire

Notes

References

Parliamentary constituencies in Bedfordshire
Constituencies of the Parliament of the United Kingdom established in 1997